Stugudal Chapel is a parish church of the Church of Norway in Tydal municipality in Trøndelag county, Norway. It is one of the churches for the Tydal parish which is part of the Stjørdal prosti (deanery) in the Diocese of Nidaros. The red, wooden church was built in a long church style in 1957 by the architect John Egil Tverdahl. The church seats about 124 people.

History
The farms in the Stugudal valley were fairly isolated for long periods of the year. This meant that the people of the valley could not get to church throughout the winters and worse, they could not transport bodies of those who had died to the church for burial. Therefore, the village received permission to build an auxiliary cemetery in Stugudalen. The cemetery was consecrated in 1907. After this, the village desired their own chapel so they wouldn't have to travel so far to get to church. The preparations for a church building started in 1946 and over the next decade money was raised to pay for the new building. The new building was completed in 1957. On 28 July 1957, the chapel was consecrated by Bishop Arne Fjellbu, and since then the chapel has been regularly used for church services. By the turn of the 21st century, the area had more holiday cottages than permanent residents in the area, so the church is used less regularly.

Media gallery

See also
List of churches in Nidaros

References

Tydal
Churches in Trøndelag
Long churches in Norway
Wooden churches in Norway
20th-century Church of Norway church buildings
Churches completed in 1957
1957 establishments in Norway